Wheelchair Football
is a fast-paced sport that is best played when
athletes are in maximum physical condition, and at the top of their game
in teamwork, strategy and wheelchair-handling skills, for both  manual wheelchair and power wheelchair users. In 2020, the USA Wheelchair Football League was launched by Move United, in partnership with the Bob Woodruff foundation and National Football League, and is launching in Chicago, Los Angeles, Phoenix and Kansas City, Missouri.

History
The sport of wheelchair football was developed by Professor Tim Nugent in 1948. The sport of wheelchair football was developed for interscholastic competition by the American Association of Adapted Sports Programs (AAASP) of Atlanta, Georgia, USA, to incorporate both the manual and power wheelchair during game play. Wheelchair football is patterned after American football, and is thus different from Powerchair Football or Wheelchair soccer (both adaptations of association football).

A competitive wheelchair football league for adults was developed in 2020 by Move United in partnership with the Bob Woodruff Foundation and National Football League. The USA Wheelchair Football League is open to adults with qualifying disabilities who play in a manual sport wheelchair.

Interscholastic Rules

It can be played either indoors or outside, as long as it meets the standard requirements. All athletes must use either a manual or a power wheelchair when competing in the sport.

Specified rules for manual and power wheelchair users

Classification 

Adaptive football players are classified into three different levels, and the rules of play are slightly different for each level.

Level 1 players: have full use of their arms, hands and eyes.
Level 2 players: have limited arm and/or hand movement and may have some type of visual impairment.
Level 3 players: have no arm-movement capability and/or have limited sight.

The rules for Level 1 players are somewhat similar to "touch football," where players touch rather than tackle their opponents. In that adaptive game, the player - and not his or her chair - must be touched to count as a tackle. Players who have limited or no mobility in their arms use chair-to-chair contact for blocks and tackles.

Scoring 

Level 1 players, kick offs, punts, runs, and goals are all scored using the hands. Level 2 and 3 players, points for pass completion are awarded if the ball hits the player in the area between the hands and their elbows.

Although the players cannot grab the football, they still need to maneuver their wheelchairs so they can be in the right position for the ball to hit the right place to score.

Team rules 

A team has six attempts to score once they receive the ball. Teams may pass or “run” the ball into the end zone. Field goals, kick–offs and punts are thrown. A running game clock (no time–outs for incomplete passes, etc.) is used, as well as a play clock. Scoring is the same as in stand–up football, with one exception.
A team that passes for the point–after–touchdown (PAT) will receive two points. Field goals are scored when the ball is thrown through the first two vertical uprights that support the hanging basket.

Basic rundown of the sport

USA Wheelchair Football League 
The USA Wheelchair Football League plays on a field that is 60-yards long and 22-yards wide with an additional 8 yards at each end for end zones. The field can be indoor or outdoor, and shall be marked with lines every 15 yards crossing the length of the field, and a mark at the 3 yard line.

The game is played in four quarters of 15 minutes each with a running game clock and a 45 second play clock.

Tackling in the USA Wheelchair Football League is completed by placing one-hand above the waist of the ball carrier.

Player Qualification 
Players must be 18+ by August 1 of the season, and have a permanent physical disability which consistently reduces the function of the lower limbs to a degree where they cannot run, pivot, block or tackle, at the speed and with the control, safety, stability and endurance required to play running football as an able bodied player.

Players are classified via a functional classification system, and will receive a classification point ranging from 1-4.5. A team consists of seven players on the field. A team may not have more than 21 classification points at the field at one time.

Scoring 
Scoring in the USA Wheelchair Football League is available via the following methods:

Touchdown: 6 points

Point After Touchdown: 1 point (passing play), 2 points (running play)

Safety: 2 points

Note, a field goal is NOT a scoring option in the USA Wheelchair Football League

Required Equipment 

 Manual Sport Wheelchair
 Football (Official NFL-size)
 Helmet (Approved by NFL/NFLPA)

Coaches/Officials 
Move United has a formal coaches and officials program which covers Rules, Concussion and Safety Protocol, Setting up Practice Plans and Officials Roles and Signals.

See also
Powerchair Football
Wheelchair soccer

References

External links
American Association for Adaptive Sports Programs

Variations of American football
Football (American)
Team sports